Prof. Martin Hilský  (born 8 April 1943 in Prague) is professor emeritus of English literature at Charles University in Prague and a translator.
He is most acclaimed for his translations into Czech of William Shakespeare's works for which he was awarded the 2011 Czech State Award for Translation. In 2001 he was named an honorary holder of the Order of the British Empire. He has also written extensive prefaces and epilogues for several books.

Translations
 Herbert Ernest Bates: The Darling Buds of May
 Jack Cope: The fair house
 T. S. Eliot: On Poetry and Poets
 J. G. Farrell: Troubles
 Ring Lardner: The Best Short Stories of Ring Lardner
 D. H. Lawrence: Women in Love
 Thomas N. Scortia: The Prometheus Crisis (with Kateřina Hilská, his wife)
 Peter Shaffer: Amadeus
 William Shakespeare: Hamlet, As you like it, King Lear, Macbeth, Love's Labour's Lost, Othello, A Midsummer Night's Dream, Sonnets, Twelfth Night, or What You Will, Antony and Cleopatra, The Tempest, Cymbeline, The Comedy of Errors, The Merchant of Venice, Much Ado About Nothing, Pericles, Prince of Tyre, The Merry Wives of Windsor, The Winter's Tale, The Taming of the Shrew 
 John Steinbeck: Cannery Row, Tortilla Flat
 John Millington Synge: The Playboy of the Western World

References

External links
 Page at the Charles University website with contact information

Czech translators
1943 births
Living people
Members of the Order of the British Empire
Translators of William Shakespeare
Recipients of the Thalia Award
Charles University alumni